Haliotis dissona is a species of sea snail, a marine gastropod mollusk in the family Haliotidae, the abalones.

Description
The size of the shell varies between 9 mm and 35 mm.

Distribution
This species occurs in the Pacific Ocean off Fiji, Mariana Islands, New Caledonia, Tonga; and off Queensland, Australia.

References

 Iredale, T. 1929. Queensland molluscan notes, No. 1. Memoirs of the Queensland Museum 9(3): 261–297, pls 30–31
 Wilson, B. 1993. Australian Marine Shells. Prosobranch Gastropods. Kallaroo, Western Australia : Odyssey Publishing Vol. 1 408 pp.
 Geiger, D.L. & Poppe, G.T. 2000. A Conchological Iconography. The family Haliotidae. Germany : ConchBooks 135 pp.
 Geiger, D.L. 2000 [1999]. Distribution and biogeography of the recent Haliotidae (Gastropoda: Vetigastropoda) world-wide. Bollettino Malacologico 35(5–12): 57–120
 Degnan, S.D., Imron, Geiger, D.L. & Degnan, B.M. 2006. Evolution in temperate and tropical seas: disparate patterns in southern hemisphere abalone (Mollusca: Vetigastropoda: Haliotidae). Molecular Phylogenetics and Evolution 41: 249–256
 Geiger D.L. & Owen B. (2012) Abalone: Worldwide Haliotidae. Hackenheim: Conchbooks. viii + 361 pp

External links
 

dissona
Gastropods described in 1929